Montebello may refer to:

Places

Australasia
 Montebello Islands, Australia

Europe
 Montebello della Battaglia, Pavia, Italy
 
 Montebello Vicentino, Vicenza, Italy
 Montebello di Bertona, Abruzzo, Pescara, Italy
 Montebello Ionico, Calabria, Reggio Calabria, Italy
 Montebello sul Sangro, Abruzzo, Chieti, Italy
 Montebello, Norway, a neighborhood in the borough of Ullern in Oslo
 Montebello (station)

Americas
 Montebello, California, United States
 Montebello/Commerce station, a Metrolink train station
 Montebello, Quebec, Canada
 Montebello station (Quebec)
 Montebello, Antioquia, Colombia
 Montebello Lakes National Park, Mexico

 Coldstream-Homestead-Montebello, Baltimore, a neighborhood of Baltimore, United States
 Montebello, New York, United States
 Montebello, Virginia, United States
 Montebello (Charlottesville, Virginia), a historic home

 Montebello Creek, a tributary of Stevens Creek in Santa Clara County, California
 Montebello, Nova Scotia, a neighbourhood of Dartmouth, Nova Scotia, Canada

People
 Saviour Montebello (1762–1809), Maltese theologian, academic and leader in resistance against the French

Other uses
 Montebello tenuis, a genus of Liocranid sac spider
 Montebello Castle, in Bellinzona, Switzerland
 Montebello (ship), several ships
 Battle of Montebello (disambiguation), two different battles
 Château Montebello, a hotel in Quebec, Canada

See also
Monte Bello (disambiguation)